The 2019 Pac-12 Conference football season was the 41st season of Pac–12 football taking place during the 2019 NCAA Division I FBS football season. The season began on August 29, 2019, and end with the 2019 Pac–12 Championship Game on December 6, 2019, at Levi Stadium in Santa Clara, California. The Pac-12 is a Power Five Conference under the College Football Playoff format along with the Atlantic Coast Conference, the Big 12 Conference, Big Ten Conference, and the Southeastern Conference, For the 2019 season, the Pac-12 is the ninth for the twelve teams divided into two divisions of six teams each, named North and South. The entire schedule was released on December 4, 2018.

Previous season
The Washington Huskies defeated Utah Utes 10–3 in the Pac-12 Football Championship Game.

Seven teams participated in bowl games. Arizona State lost to Fresno State 20–31 in the Las Vegas Bowl. California lost to TCU 7–10 in the Cheez-It Bowl.  Washington State defeated Iowa State 28–26 in the Alamo Bowl.  Utah lost to Northwestern 20–31 in the Holiday Bowl.  Stanford defeated Pitt 14–13 Sun Bowl. Oregon defeated Michigan State 7–6 in the Redbox Bowl.  Washington lost to Ohio State by a score of 23–28 in the Rose Bowl Game.

Preseason
2019 Pac-12 Spring Football and number of signees on signing day:

North Division
California – 24
Oregon – 27
Oregon State – 19
Stanford – 23
Washington – 23
Washington State – 20

South Division  
Arizona – 19
Arizona State – 21
Colorado – 25
UCLA – 19
USC – 25
Utah – 18

Recruiting classes

Pac-12 Media Days
The Pac-12 will conduct its 2019 Pac-12 media days at the Loews Hollywood Hotel, in Hollywood, California, on July 24 on the Pac-12 Network.

The teams and representatives in respective order were as follows:

 Pac-12 Commissioner – Larry Scott 
 Arizona – Kevin Sumlin (HC), Khalil Tate (QB) and J. J. Taylor (RB)
 Arizona State – Herm Edwards, Eno Benjamin (RB), Cohal Cabral (C)
 California – Justin Wilcox (HC), Evan Weaver (LB), Camryn Bynum (CB)
 Colorado – Mel Tucker (HC), Laviska Shenault (WR), Nate Landman (LB)
 Oregon – Mario Cristobal (HC), Justin Herbert (QB), Troy Dye (LB)
 Oregon State – Jonathan Smith (HC), Jermar Jefferson (RB), Isaiah Hodgins (WR)
 Stanford – David Shaw (HC), K. J. Costello (QB), LB Casey Toohill (LB)
 UCLA – Chip Kelly (HC), Joshua Kelley (RB), Krys Barnes (LB)
 USC – Clay Helton (HC), Michael Pittman Jr. (WR), DE Christian Rector (DE)
 Utah – Kyle Whittingham (HC), Zack Moss (RB), Bradlee Anae (DE)
 Washington – Chris Petersen (HC), Nick Harris (C), Myles Bryant (DB)
 Washington State – Mike Leach (HC), Liam Ryan (OL), Jahad Woods (LB)

Preseason Media polls
The preseason polls will be released on July 24, 2019. Since 1992, the credentialed media has gotten the preseason champion correct just five times. Only eight times has the preseason pick even made it to the Pac-12 title game. Below are the results of the media poll with total points received next to each school and first-place votes in parentheses. For the 2019 poll, Utah was voted as the favorite to win both the South Division and the Pac–12 Championship Game.

Preseason awards

Preseason All-Pac-12

First Team

Second Team

Head coaches

Coaching changes
There was only one coaching change following the 2019 season including Mel Tucker with Colorado.

Coaches

Rankings

Schedules

All times Pacific time.  Pac-12 teams in bold.

Rankings reflect those of the AP poll for that week.

Regular season
The regular season began on August 24, 2019, and will end on November 30, 2019.

Week 1

Week 2

Week 3

Week 4

Week 5

Week 6

Week 7

Week 8

Week 9

Week 10

Week 11

Week 12

Week 13

Week 14

Pac-12 Championship Game

The Pac-12 Championship Game was played on December 6, 2019 at Levi's Stadium in Santa Clara, CA. It featured the teams with the best conference records from each division, the North (Oregon) and the South (Utah). This was the ninth championship game.

Pac-12 records vs Other Conferences
2019–2020 records against non-conference foes:

Regular Season

Post Season

Pac-12 vs Power Five matchups
This is a list of the power conference teams (ACC, Big 10, Big 12, Notre Dame and SEC) that the Pac-12 plays in the non-conference games. Although the NCAA does not consider BYU a "Power Five" school, the Pac-12 considers games against BYU as satisfying its "Power Five" scheduling requirement. All rankings are from the AP Poll at the time of the game.

Pac-12 vs Group of Five matchups
The following games include Pac-12 teams competing against teams from the American, C-USA, MAC, Mountain West or Sun Belt.

Pac-12 vs FBS independents matchups
The following games include Pac-12 teams competing against FBS Independents, which includes Army, Liberty, New Mexico State, or UMass.

Pac-12 vs FCS matchups

Postseason

Bowl games

Rankings are from CFP rankings.  All times Pacific Time Zone.  Pac-12 teams shown in bold.

Selection of teams
Bowl eligible: Arizona State, California, Oregon, USC, Utah, Washington, Washington State
Bowl-ineligible: Arizona, Colorado, Oregon State, Stanford, UCLA

Awards and honors

Player of the week honors

Pac-12 Individual Awards
The following individuals received postseason honors as voted by the Pac-12 Conference football coaches at the end of the season

All-conference teams
The following players earned All-Pac-12 honors. Any teams showing (_) following their name are indicating the number of All-Pac-12 Conference Honors awarded to that university for 1st team and 2nd team respectively. Utah leads the Pac-12 with 8 First team and 2 Second team, followed by Washington with 5 First team and 4 Second team, USC with 3 First team and 5 Second team, Arizona State with 5 First team and 1 Second team, Oregon with 2 First team and 3 Second team, Washington State and Stanford with 1 First team and 3 Second team, Colorado and California with 1 First team and 2 Second team,  Oregon State with 3 Second team, UCLA with 1 Second team and Arizona receiving none for either team

Honorable mentions
ARIZONA: DB Lorenzo Burns, RJr.; OL Cody Creason, RSr.; LB Colin Schooler, Jr.; RB J. J. Taylor, RJr.; Jace Whittaker, RSr.
ARIZONA STATE: WR Frank Darby, RJr.;  DB Jack Jones, RJr.; LB Khaylan Kearse-Thomas, RSr.; DL Jermayne Lole, So.; OL Dohnovan West, Fr.; DB Kobe Williams, Sr.
CALIFORNIA: OL Jake Curhan, Jr.; LB Kuony Deng, Jr.; LB Cameron Goode, Jr.; DB Jaylinn Hawkins, Sr.; DL Zeandae Johnson, Sr.
COLORADO: WR Tony Brown, Sr.; OL Arlington Hambright, Grad.; LB Davion Taylor, Sr.
OREGON: DB Thomas Graham Jr., Jr.; OL Jake Hanson, Sr.; QB Justin Herbert, Sr.; DB Jevon Holland, So.; DB Deommodore Lenoir, Jr.; DL Jordon Scott, Jr.; DL Kayvon Thibodeaux, Fr.; OL Calvin Throckmorton, Sr.; RS Mykael Wright, Fr.   
OREGON STATE: OL Brandon Kipper, RSo.; QB Jake Luton, RSr.; TE Noah Togiai, RSr.
STANFORD: DL Thomas Booker, So.; LB Curtis Robinson, Sr.; OL Foster Sarell, Jr.; RS Connor Wedington, Jr.
UCLA: TE Devin Asiasi, Jr.; LB Krys Barnes, Sr.; DB Darnay Holmes, Jr.; P Wade Lees, Grad.,
USC: DB Olaijah Griffin, So.; LB John Houston Jr., RSr.; PK Chase McGrath, RSo.; WR Amon-Ra St. Brown, So.; QB Kedon Slovis, Fr.; WR Tyler Vaughns, RJr.
UTAH: DB Terrell Burgess, Sr.; OL Nick Ford; DB Javelin Guidry, Jr.; LB Devin Lloyd, So.; OL Simi Moala, RFr.; DL Mika Tafua, So.; OL Orlando Umana, Jr.
WASHINGTON: RB Salvon Ahmed, Jr.; DB Kyler Gordon, RFr.; P Joel Whitford, Sr.
WASHINGTON STATE: RB Max Borghi, So.; OL Josh Watson, RJr.; WR Easop Winston, Sr.; LB Jahad Woods, RJr.

All-Americans

Currently, the NCAA compiles consensus all-America teams in the sports of Division I-FBS football and Division I men's basketball using a point system computed from All-America teams named by coaches associations or media sources.  The system consists of three points for a first-team honor, two points for second-team honor, and one point for third-team honor.  Honorable mention and fourth team or lower recognitions are not accorded any points.  College Football All-American consensus teams are compiled by position and the player accumulating the most points at each position is named first team consensus all-American.  Currently, the NCAA recognizes All-Americans selected by the AP, AFCA, FWAA, TSN, and the WCFF to determine Consensus and Unanimous All-Americans. Any player named to the First Team by all five of the NCAA-recognized selectors is deemed a Unanimous All-American.

*AFCA All-America Team (AFCA)
*Walter Camp All-America Team
*AP All-America teams
*Sporting News All-America Team
*Football Writers Association of America All-America Team (FWAA)
*Sports Illustrated All-America Team
*Report All-America Team (BR)
*College Football News All-America Team (CFN)
*ESPN All-America Team
*CBS Sports All-America Team
*Athlon Sports All-America Team (Athlon)
*The Athletic All-America Team
*USA Today All-America Team

All-Academic

National award winners
2019 College Football Award Winners

Home game attendance

Bold – Exceed capacity
†Season High

NFL Draft
The following list includes all Pac-12 players who were drafted in the 2020 NFL draft.

References